The Monarch class was a class of three coastal defense ships built by Austria-Hungary at the end of the 19th century. The Monarchs were the first ships of their type to utilize turrets.

Monarch was launched on 9 May 1895, Wien on 7 July 1895, and Budapest just over a year later on 24 July 1896. The ships saw very little service during World War I in the V Division of the Austro-Hungarian fleet. Budapest and Wien took part in the bombardment of Italian positions along the Adriatic coast in 1915 and 1917, but the three battleships went largely inactive for the remainder of war.

In 1917, Wien was struck by Italian torpedoes and sank in her home port of Trieste. The remaining two ships were ceded to Great Britain following the end of the war and were scrapped between 1920 and 1922.

Construction 

By 1893, sufficient funds were available to build three replacement ships, but the Hungarian and Austrian parliaments authorized only the construction of a smaller class of coastal defense ships, as Austro-Hungarian naval policy at that time was primarily concerned with coastal defense. Budapest was fitted with more powerful engines than her sister ships, giving her a higher top speed. Budapest and  Wien were built in the Stabilimento Tecnico Triestino yards in Trieste, and Monarch was constructed at the Naval Arsenal in Pula.

The first ship of the class, Wien, was laid down on 16 February 1893. She was launched on 7 July 1895, about a month after Monarch. Despite this, Wien was the first ship of the new class to be commissioned into the Austro-Hungarian Navy, on 13 May 1897. The second ship of the class, Monarch, was laid down on 31 July 1893, launched on 9 May 1895, and was commissioned into the Austro-Hungarian Navy on 11 May 1898. Budapest was the third and final ship of the class. She was laid down on the same day as Wien, on 16 February 1893, and launched from the Naval Arsenal in Pula on 24 July 1896. She was commissioned on 12 May 1898, a day after Monarch.

Design

Armament and armor 
The members of the Monarch class displaced . Their armament consisted of four  L/40 guns with two guns in each of the two turrets, six  L/40 guns, 10  L/44 guns, four  L/33 guns, one  MG gun, and two torpedo tubes. A single Škoda 7 cm K10 anti-aircraft gun was installed on SMS Budapest and SMS Wien in 1917 , while SMS Monarch received one of the earlier Škoda  L/45 BAG anti-aircraft guns.

Ships of the Monarch class were fitted with Harvey armour throughout.

Propulsion and crew 

Monarch-class ships normally carried 300 tons of coal, but could hold up to 500 tons. Each ship was manned by 26 officers and 397 crewmen, a total of 423 personnel per ship.

Service history

Peace time 

Upon being commissioned into the Austro-Hungarian Navy, the three ships of the Monarch class were used for a variety of purposes. All three ships of the Monarch class partook in a cruise around the Adriatic and Aegean in 1899, to display the Austro-Hungarian flag in foreign waters. The Monarch class formed the I Battleship Division of the Austro-Hungarian Navy. The battleship Wien participated in the Diamond Jubilee of the crowning of Queen Victoria in 1897, as well as the international blockade off Crete during the Greco-Turkish War of 1897.

However, less than five years after their completion, the Monarch-class battleships were rendered obsolete by the newly commissioned . The newly completed  conducted a training cruise with the three Monarch-class battleships in January 1903; they were joined by  the following year. During the 1904 training exercises, the three Habsburg-class battleships engaged the three Monarchs in simulated combat; the maneuver marked the first time two homogeneous squadrons consisting of modern battleships operated in the Austro-Hungarian Navy. The three Habsburg-class ships took over the position of the I Division while the Monarchs formed the newly created II Division. They were serving as coastal defense ships by the beginning of World War I.

World War I 

At the outbreak of World War I in July 1914, the three ships of the Monarch class were serving as the V Battleship Division, deployed as coastal defense ships. They also served as training ships, and were used to bombard coastal positions during the early years of the war. In August 1914, Budapest was transferred from Pula to Cattaro to shell Mount Lovcen. On 9 August 1914 Monarch shelled the French radio station at Budva. She also bombarded the Montenegrin radio station off Bar on 17 August and another station off Volovica Point on 19 August where she attacked the local radio station and barracks. Following these operations, Monarch served as a harbor defense ship. On 28–29 December 1915  Budapest supported the cruisers and destroyers of the Austro-Hungarian Navy that were to raid Durazzo, but the detachment returned to port without having opened fire on the enemy. On 9 January 1916, Budapest again bombarded the fortifications on Mount Lovcen, and helped to capture the enemy-held mountain. In late 1917 Budapest and Wien were sent to Trieste, and participated in shelling Italian troops in the Gulf of Trieste. On 10 December 1917, two Italian torpedo boats managed to penetrate the port of Trieste undetected, and fired torpedoes at the battleships Budapest and Wien. The torpedo fired at Budapest missed, but Wien was hit twice and sank in less than five minutes in the shallow water of the Trieste harbor. Forty-six men serving on Wien were killed in the attack. Budapest was subsequently given the task that Monarch had been performing for over three years, and was demoted to a floating barrack for German U-boat crews. In June 1918 Budapest was renovated and had a  L/17 howitzer installed in her bow to use for coastal bombardment, but she never saw action with the new gun in place. At the end of the war in 1918, the remaining Monarch-class battleships, Budapest and Monarch, were handed over to Great Britain as war reparations. In 1920 the two ships were sold for scrap to Italy, and were broken up between 1920 and 1922.

Citations

References

External links
 

 
Battleship classes
World War I battleships of Austria-Hungary